Roger Hendrik van Hamburg (born 5 April 1954) is a former freestyle and medley swimmer from the Netherlands, who competed for his home country at the 1972 Summer Olympics. There he was eliminated in the heats of the 400 m individual medley and 4 × 100 m and 4 × 200 m freestyle relays.

He is married to Diana Rickard, an Australian Olympic swimmer. They have a daughter, Sasha, who is married to Adam Pine, also an Australian Olympic swimmer. Since about 2000, Roger and Diana run a swimming school near Sydney, Australia.

References

1954 births
Living people
Dutch male medley swimmers
Dutch male freestyle swimmers
Olympic swimmers of the Netherlands
Swimmers at the 1972 Summer Olympics
People from Falcón